Gardenscapes: New Acres is a casual match-3 game, released in 2016 for Android and iOS devices and also on Facebook.

Gameplay 
The original version of Gardenscapes, which was released for Microsoft Windows in October 2009, and was later released on OS X, iOS, Android, the Nintendo DS and 3DS, was a hidden objects game in which the player runs a B&B hotel. A sequel - Gardenscapes 2, was released in April 2013.

According to VentureBeat, a mobile version was in development for over four years and was released in 2016 as a combination  of match-3 gameplay with a city-building core. The storyline is centered on a butler named Austin, who strives to rebuild the dilapidated mansion and garden. To complete the chores, the user must complete levels and earn the required "stars". Gardenscapes allows players to choose decorations for cleaned-up areas of a massively overgrown garden as they level up. The core gameplay is completed with pin-pulling mini-games in which players need to solve puzzles to save characters.

Playrix regularly releases seasonal updates, for example, Christmas Collaterals. In addition, in 2021, they launched Yoga Season in collaboration with the World Health Organization. The storyline describes recommendations on how to stay healthy while self-isolating.

Commercial and sequels 

After the release, Gardenscapes was named one of the Top-10 free games for iPhone and iPad in 100 countries. The project was released not only on the App Store, where on the first day it was downloaded more than a million times but also on Google Play and Amazon Appstore. Gardenscapes was named by Facebook its Overall Game of the Year for 2016. As a result, the developers entered the Top-20 mobile publishers in the world.

By 2019, Gardenscapes was named the fifth highest-grossing puzzle game generating  $1.5 billion from in-app purchases. The total number of app installs exceeded 213 million. An average revenue per install was about $7, making it one of the lead publisher's games. Google Play users have accounted for 70 percent of Gardenscapes' downloads and contributed 47 percent of overall revenue.

During the COVID-19 pandemic, Gardenscapes' audience was over 10 million daily active players. Sensor Tower estimated that Gardenscapes  made almost $2 billion in lifetime revenue by 2021. According to Statista, as of May 2021, the game remained the Playrix's most downloaded product with over 461.41 million total downloads.

The success of the original game led to a series of sequels, such as Gardenscapes 2. A year after the release of Gardenscapes in 2016, the developers also launched a similar project - Homescapes, in which the main character returns to his childhood mansion and tries to restore it.

Critics
Since 2016, Playrix has been running an active marketing strategy. However, Facebook advertisements for Gardenscapes and Homescapes were referred to as misleading and "not representative" at the beginning of 2020. Developers declared that  the promoted images of gameplay captured mini-games available every 20 levels. Therefore, most of the audience didn’t see it, stopping at the lower levels. The Advertising Standards Authority banned banners in October 2020 and warned Playrix  about the representativity of other campaigns.

References

External links

2016 video games
Android (operating system) games
Browser games
Casual games
False advertising
IOS games
Tile-matching video games
Playrix games
Single-player video games
Video games developed in Russia